Edward Carragher (24 May 1891 – 28 November 1977) was an Australian cricketer. He played two first-class matches for South Australia in 1922/23.

See also
 List of South Australian representative cricketers

References

External links
 

1891 births
1977 deaths
Australian cricketers
South Australia cricketers
People from Broken Hill, New South Wales
Cricketers from New South Wales